is a railway station located in the city of Kitaakita, Akita Prefecture, Japan, operated by the third sector railway operator Akita Nairiku Jūkan Railway.

Lines
Ogata Station is served by the Nariku Line, and is located 3.7 km from the terminus of the line at Takanosu Station.

Station layout
The station consists of one side platform serving a single bi-directional track. The station is unattended.

Adjacent stations

History
Ogata Station(小ヶ田駅, Ogata-eki) opened on December 10, 1963 as a station on the Japan National Railways (JNR) serving the town of Takanosu, Akita. The line was extended on to Aniai Station by September 25, 1936. The line was privatized on November 1, 1986, becoming the Akita Nairiku Jūkan Railway. On March 14, 2020, the station was renamed to Jōmon-Ogata Station (縄文小ヶ田駅, Jōmon-Ogata-eki).

Surrounding area
 Isedōtai Site
 Yoneshiro River

References

External links

 Nairiku Railway Station information 

Railway stations in Japan opened in 1963
Railway stations in Akita Prefecture
Kitaakita